In telecommunication, data signaling rate (DSR), also known as gross bit rate, is the aggregate rate at which data passes a point in the transmission path of a data transmission system.

 The DSR is usually expressed in bits per second.
 The data signaling rate is given by  where m is the number of parallel channels, ni is the number of significant conditions of the modulation in the i-th channel, and Ti is the unit interval, expressed in seconds, for the i-th channel.
 For serial transmission in a single channel, the DSR reduces to (1/T)log2n; with a two-condition modulation, i. e. n = 2, the DSR is 1/T, according to Hartley's law.
 For parallel transmission with equal unit intervals and equal numbers of significant conditions on each channel, the DSR is (m/T)log2n; in the case of a two-condition modulation, this reduces to m/T.
 The DSR may be expressed in bauds, in which case, the factor log2ni in the above summation formula should be deleted when calculating bauds.
 In synchronous binary signaling, the DSR in bits per second may be numerically the same as the modulation rate expressed in bauds. Signal processors, such as four-phase modems, cannot change the DSR, but the modulation rate depends on the line modulation scheme, in accordance with Note 4. For example, in a 2400 bit/s 4-phase sending modem, the signaling rate is 2400 bit/s on the serial input side, but the modulation rate is only 1200 bauds on the 4-phase output side.

Maximum rate 

The maximum user signaling rate, synonymous to gross bit rate or data signaling rate, is the maximum rate, in bits per second, at which binary information can be transferred in a given direction between users over the telecommunications system facilities dedicated to a particular information transfer transaction, under conditions of continuous transmission and no overhead information.

In the case where an end-to-end telecommunications service is provided by tandem channels, the end-to-end signaling rate is the lowest signaling rate among the component channels.

Rates and standards

See also 
 Bit rate
 Bandwidth (computing)
 Baud

References 
 

Data transmission
Temporal rates